Mattia Piras (born 22 Jenuary 1992) is an Italian footballer who plays for US Offanenghese.

Biography

Youth career
Born in Crema, Lombardy, Piras started his career at hometown club PergoCrema. He was the member of Giovanissimi Regionali under-15 team in 2006–07 season; both Allievi Regionali U-16 team and Allievi Nazionali under-17 team in 2007–08 season. In August 2008 Piras left for AlbinoLeffe. He was the member of Allievi Nazionali under-17 team that season. Piras also received his only call-up from Italy national team in February 2009, for the U-17 team. On 11 August 2009 Piras was signed by Genoa in co-ownership deal for €100,000. Piras was a member of Berretti under-20 team (or under-18 team), the B team of U-20 age group. Piras was a member of Primavera under-20 team in 2010–11 season, but only made 11 starts (out of 26 games) Piras was a midfielder for the team in 4–3–3 formation, such as in 2010–11 Coppa Italia Primavera against Internazionale.

Senior career
In June 2011 Pergocrema gave up the remain 50% registration rights of Piras to Genoa for free. In July 2011 Piras was transferred to Lega Pro Prima Divisione club SPAL in another co-ownership deal, for a peppercorn fee of €500, rejoining former Leffe teammate Andrea Beduschi. Despite a member of Berretti under-19 team as overage player, he also played for SPAL first team in Coppa Italia Lega Pro.

Piras also selected to the prima divisione Group A under-21 representative team, for 2012 Lega Pro Quadrangular Tournament. Prima Divisione Group A team won that tournament and Piras was in the starting XI in the final despite replaced by Marcello Falzerano at half time.

Piras joined Sant'Angelo ahead of the 2019/20 season. In December 2019, he moved to Eccellenza club US Offanenghese.

References

Italian footballers
Association football midfielders
People from Crema, Lombardy
1992 births
Living people
U.S. Pergolettese 1932 players
U.C. AlbinoLeffe players
Genoa C.F.C. players
S.P.A.L. players
Serie C players
Serie D players
Eccellenza players
A.S.D. Fanfulla players
A.C.D. Sant'Angelo 1907 players
Sportspeople from the Province of Cremona
Footballers from Lombardy